Band-e Ozbak (also known as Bandārīk and Bandar Ozbak) is a village in Jangal Rural District, Jangal District, Roshtkhar County, Razavi Khorasan Province, Iran. At the 2006 census, its population was 584, in 112 families.

See also 

 List of cities, towns and villages in Razavi Khorasan Province

References 

Populated places in Roshtkhar County